The Myers-White House, also known as Sycamore Grove, is a private residence located near Hertford in the Bethel Township of Perquimans County, North Carolina.  It is one of the  oldest private homes in the state. The exact construction date is not known. It was likely constructed in the early 1700s. Thomas Long (~1730) is assumed to be the architect and builder.  It is a -story frame dwelling with brick ends and a gambrel roof.  It is one of the two known gambrel roof houses with
brick ends in the state.  It is a member of the small group of 18th century frame houses with brick ends in northeast North Carolina; the group includes the Sutton-Newby House and the Old Brick House.

It was added to the National Register of Historic Places in 1972.

Gallery

References

External links

Historic American Buildings Survey in North Carolina
Houses on the National Register of Historic Places in North Carolina
Houses completed in 1730
Houses in Perquimans County, North Carolina
National Register of Historic Places in Perquimans County, North Carolina